The Tourette Syndrome Clinical Global Impression (TS-CGI) is a psychological measure used to briefly assess severity of tics.

References 

Mental disorders screening and assessment tools
Tourette syndrome